Try Love may refer to:

Try Love (B. E. Taylor album)
Try Love (Amii Stewart album)